A complexometric indicator is an ionochromic dye that undergoes a definite color change in presence of specific metal ions. It forms a weak complex with the ions present in the solution, which has a significantly different color from the form existing outside the complex.
Complexometric indicators are also known as pM indicators.

Complexometric titration
In analytical chemistry, complexometric indicators are used in complexometric titration to indicate the exact moment when all the metal ions in the solution are sequestered by a chelating agent (most usually EDTA). Such indicators are also called metallochromic indicators.

The indicator may be present in another liquid phase in equilibrium with the titrated phase, the indicator is described as extraction indicator.

Some complexometric indicators are sensitive to air and are destroyed. When such solution loses color during titration, a drop or two of fresh indicator may have to be added.

Examples
Complexometric indicators are water-soluble organic molecules. Some examples are:

 Calcein with EDTA for calcium
 Patton-Reeder Indicator with EDTA for calcium with magnesium
 Curcumin for boron, that forms Rosocyanine, although the red color change of curcumin also occurs for pH > 8.4
 Eriochrome Black T for aluminium, cadmium, zinc, calcium and magnesium
 Fast Sulphon Black with EDTA for copper
 Hematoxylin for copper
 Murexide for calcium and rare earths, but also for copper, nickel, cobalt, and thorium
 Xylenol orange for gallium, indium and scandium

Redox indicators
In some settings, when the titrated system is a redox system whose equilibrium is influenced by the removal of the metal ions, a redox indicator can function as a complexometric indicator.

References

Analytical chemistry
 
Indicators